Roger Nelson may refer to:

Roger Nelson (politician) (1759–1815), represented Maryland in the United States House of Representatives
Roger Nelson (skydiver) (1955–2003), founder of Skydive Chicago
Roger Nelson (Canadian football) (1932–1996), Canadian Football League football player
Roger Nelson (baseball) (born 1944), Major League Baseball pitcher, 1967–1976
Roger D. Nelson, director of the Global Consciousness Project

See also
Prince (musician) (1958–2016), aka Prince Rogers Nelson